Backyard Soccer MLS Edition is a children's soccer video game developed by Humongous Entertainment and released in 2000 as part of the Backyard Sports series. Unlike the series' previous game, Backyard Soccer, this edition was the first to feature Major League Soccer (MLS) teams, including several women from the United States women's national soccer team that won the 1999 FIFA Women's World Cup. Aimed at children ages 5 to 10, the game includes international soccer players such as the Dallas Burn's Jason Kreis and female player Brandi Chastain, but with the added twist that all the MLS players are drawn as child caricatures in the game. The edition was released for the Macintosh and Windows platforms. A planned release for the Game Boy Color was cancelled.

In the game, players manage a soccer team through a season and participate in matches played against the computer. As the team coach, users also must deal with the rise and fall of individual team member's skills during the season. Players can play with actual teams from the MLS or customize their own team from a pool of MLS players, and the game allows users to disable select rules such as offside. The game also offers a two-player mode on a single computer where one player uses the mouse to control their team and the other uses the keyboard.

Reception
The Dallas Daily News noted that the game only offered three female soccer stars to play as, but they appreciated the game's replay value.

References

External links
 
 Archived review from GamersPulse.com

2000 video games
Humongous Entertainment games
Infogrames games
Classic Mac OS games
Video games developed in the United States
Windows games
Association football video games